Congee or conjee is a type of rice porridge or gruel eaten in Asian countries. It can be eaten plain, where it is typically served with side dishes, or it can be served with ingredients such as meat, fish, seasonings and flavourings, most often savory, but sometimes sweet. It is typically served as a meal on its own, especially for breakfast or people who are ill. Names for congee are as varied as the style of its preparation, but all are made with rice cooked as a softened porridge with a larger quantity of water than other types of cooked rice like pilaf or claypot rice.

Etymology 
The English word congee is derived from the Tamil word kanji (kañci). In Chinese, it is known as zhou. It is mentioned in the Book of Rites and noted in Pliny’s account of India circa 77 CE. In Tulu language it is known as Ganji.

Preparation 
To prepare the dish, rice is boiled in a large amount of water until it softens significantly. Congee can be made in a pot or in a rice cooker. Some rice cookers have a "congee" setting, allowing it to be cooked overnight. The type of rice used can be either short- or long-grain, depending on what is available and regional cultural influences. Culture also often dictates the way congee is cooked and eaten.

In some cultures, congee is eaten primarily as a breakfast food or late supper; some may also eat it as a substitute for rice at other meals. It is often considered particularly suitable for the sick as a mild, easily digestible food. Because of this, it is commonly served as a staple meal for patients in healthcare facilities.

Regional varieties

East Asia

China 

While plain congee is a staple dish in China, it is called congee only in Hong Kong English but is more commonly recognised as jūk. Natively, plain congee is known by other local names such as báizhōu in Central and Northern China. Another common Chinese name for it in the Mandarin dialect is xīfàn.

Chinese congees vary considerably by region. For example, to make Cantonese congee, white rice is boiled in many times its weight in water for a long time until the rice breaks down and becomes a fairly thick, white porridge. Congees made in other regions may use different types of rice with different quantities of water, producing congees of different consistencies. It can be left watery, or cooked until it has a texture similar to Western oatmeal porridge. Congee can also be made from brown rice, although this is less common and takes longer to cook. Congee made from other grains, such as cornmeal, millet, barley, and sorghum, are common in the north of China where rice does not grow as well as other grains suited for a colder climate. Multigrain congee mixes are sold in the health food sections of Chinese supermarkets.

Savory congee, generally cooked with salt and often fresh ginger and other flavorful ingredients, is usually eaten with zhacai, salted duck eggs, lettuce and dace (Chinese mud carp paste), bamboo shoots, youtiao, rousong, pickled tofu, wheat gluten, with other condiments, meats and organ meats including tripe and intestine, crab or hundred-year eggs. Other seasonings such as white pepper and soy sauce may be added after the congee is cooked. Grilled or steamed and deboned fish may be mixed in to provide a different texture.

Plain congee is commonly eaten with youtiao (lightly salted fried dough) as breakfast in many areas in China. Congee with mung beans is usually eaten with sugar, as is red bean congee, or in Laba congee.

Besides being an everyday meal, congee is considered to be food therapy for the unwell. Ingredients can be determined by their supposed therapeutic value as well as flavor. It is also used to feed infants.

The origin of congee is unknown, but from many historical accounts, it was usually served during times of famine, or when numerous patrons visited the temples, as a way to stretch the rice supply to feed more people.

The autumn porridge festival is celebrated by villagers eating congee together on that day, the meaning being that they pray for everything to go smoothly and to build a good relationship with the neighborhood. A village called Lingshuicun to the west of Beijing celebrates Liu Maoheng, a Qing-era Juren who helped villagers during a period of famine, through the autumn porridge festival.

Japan 

, or often  is the name for the type of congee eaten in Japan, which typically uses water to rice ratios of 5:1 or 7:1 and is cooked for about 30 minutes.

Kayu may be made with just rice and water, and is often seasoned with salt. Eggs can be beaten into it to thicken it. Toppings may be added to enhance flavour; Welsh onion, salmon, roe, ginger, and umeboshi (pickled ume fruit) are among the most common. Miso or chicken stock may be used to flavor the broth. Most Japanese electric rice cookers have a specific setting for cooking congee.

In Japan kayu – because it is soft and easily digestible – is regarded as a food particularly suitable for serving to the sick and elderly. For similar reasons kayu is commonly the first solid food served to Japanese infants; it is used to help with the transition from liquids to normally cooked rice, the latter being a major part of the Japanese diet.

A type of kayu referred to as nanakusa-gayu ("seven herb porridge") is traditionally eaten on 7 January with special herbs that some believe protect against evils and invite good luck and longevity in the new year. As a simple, light dish, nanakusa-gayu serves as a break from the many heavy dishes eaten over the Japanese New Year.

Kayu is also used in Shinto divination rituals.

 is a similar dish, which uses already cooked rice, rather than cooking the rice in the soup.

Korea 

Depending on the ingredients and consistency,  can be considered as food for recuperation, a delicacy, or famine food. It is known to have nutritional benefits, and is considered to be beneficial to digestion because of its soft texture. It is a staple "get well" dish; a dish to eat when one is sick or recovering from bad health.  is also considered an ideal food for babies, the ill or elderly, as it is easily eaten and digested. It is also sold commercially by many chain stores in South Korea, and is a common takeout dish.

There are more than forty varieties of  mentioned in old documents.

The following list are examples of juk:  – jujube porridge,  – chicken porridge,  – sweetfish porridge,  – black sesame porridge,  – pumpkin porridge,  – beef porridge,  – pine nut porridge,  – abalone rice porridge,  – red bean porridge,  – milk porridge.

Taiwan 

In Taiwan, congee is known as xifan or zhou (粥), or more commonly known in Taiwanese, muê (糜). Congee is often consumed for breakfast or as an easily digestible food for children and those who are ill. Sweet potato, taro root, or century egg is often added for taste. Ground pork is also a common ingredient added with century egg, creating the dish known as pidan shourou zhou (皮蛋瘦肉粥). Another famous congee dish in Taiwan is the milkfish congee, which uses milkfish belly as a topping for congee.

Southeast Asia

Myanmar 
It is plain porridge, often made with just rice and water, but sometimes with chicken or pork stock and served with a simple garnish of chopped spring onions and crispy fried onions.

Cambodia 

In Khmer, congee is called babor. It is one of the options for breakfast along with kuyteav, another popular Cambodian breakfast dish. Congee is eaten throughout Cambodia both in the countryside and in the cities.

Congee can be eaten plain or with a variety of side dishes and toppings such as soy sauce, added to enhance taste, as well as dried salted fish or fried breadsticks.

There are two main versions of congee: plain congee, and chicken congee. It is usually eaten during the colder dry season or when someone is sick. After the congee is prepared a variety of toppings can be added to enhance the flavour such as bean sprouts, green onions, coriander, pepper, along with the dried fish and fried breadsticks on the side. The chicken congee is the same as plain congee but contains more herbs and chicken.

Indonesia 

In Indonesia, congee is called bubur, and it is a popular breakfast food. Travelling bubur ayam vendors frequently pass through residential streets in the morning selling the dish. A popular version is bubur ayam, which is rice congee with shredded chicken meat. Unlike some of other Indonesian dishes, it is not spicy; sambal or chili paste is served separately.

Some food venders serve sate alongside it, made from quail egg or chicken intestine, liver, gizzard, or heart.

On the north coast of Bali, famously in a village called Bondalem, there is a local congee dish called mengguh, a popular local chicken and vegetable rice congee that is spicier than common bubur ayam and more similar to tinutuan, using a spice mix of onions, garlic, coriander seeds, pepper and chili.

In another region of Indonesia — the city of Manado in North Sulawesi, there is a very popular type of congee called tinutuan, or also known as bubur Manado (Manadonese porridge). It is rice porridge served with ample amount of vegetables. A bit different from the one sold in Java, it is made from rice porridge, enriched with vegetables, including kangkung (water spinach), corn kernels, yam or sweet potato, dried salted fish, kemangi (lemon basil) leaves and melinjo (Gnetum gnemon) leaves.

On eastern parts of Indonesia, their kind of congee is called papeda, which is made from sago flour. It is a staple food of Maluku and Papuan people. Usually, it is eaten with yellow soup made from tuna or mubara fish spiced with turmeric and lime.

Laos 
In Laos, congee is called khao piak, literally "wet rice". It is cooked with rice and chicken broth or water. The congee is then garnished with fried garlic, scallions and pepper. The dish will sometimes be served with chicken, quail eggs, century eggs or youtiao. In Laos, congee is usually eaten as breakfast and during the cold season.

Malaysia 
In Malaysia, congee is known as porridge or bubur.

Philippines 

Lugaw (pronounced ) is the Filipino generic term for rice gruel. It encompasses a wide variety of dishes, ranging from savory dishes very similar to Chinese-style congee to dessert dishes. In the Visayan regions, savory lugaw are known as pospas. Lugaw typically use glutinous rice (Tagalog: malagkit; Visayan: pilit). It is usually thicker than other Asian congees, retaining the shape of the rice, yet with a similar texture.

Savory versions of lugaw are flavored with ginger and traditionally topped with scallions and toasted garlic. Dried red safflower (kasubha) may also be used as a topping, mainly as a visual garnish and to impart a more appealing yellow tinge to the dish. As with Japanese okayu, fish or chicken stock may be used to flavor the broth. The most popular variants of lugaw include arroz caldo (chicken), goto (beef tripe), lugaw na baboy (pork), lugaw na baka (beef), and lugaw na tokwa't baboy (diced tofu and pork). Other versions can also use tinapa (smoked fish), palaka (frog legs), utak (brain [of pig]), dila (tongue [of pig]), and litid ([beef] ligaments). They are traditionally seasoned with calamansi, fish sauce (patis), soy sauce (toyo), and black pepper. It is often served to the ill and the elderly, and is favored among Filipinos living in colder climates because it is warm, soft, and easy to digest.

Dessert versions of lugaw include champorado (lugaw with home-made chocolate topped with milk), binignit (lugaw in coconut milk with various fruits and root crops), and ginataang mais (lugaw with sweet corn and coconut milk), among others. Like the savory versions, they are usually eaten for breakfast, but can also be eaten as a snack. In Hiligaynon-speaking areas, lugaw may refer to binignit.

Singapore 

In Singapore, Teochew porridge or Singapore-style porridge is a version of Singapore congee. In Singapore, it's considered a comfort food for both breakfast and supper. Teochew porridge dish often accompanied with various small plates of side dishes. Usually, it's served as a banquet of meats, fish egg and vegetables eaten with plain rice porridge. The recipes that early immigrants prepared in Singapore have been modified over the generations to suit local tastes. Singapore Teochew style porridge is usually consumed with a selection of Singaporean Chinese side dishes like Nasi Padang. There is no fixed list of side dishes, but in Singapore, accompaniments typically include lor bak (braised pork), steamed fish, stir-fried water spinach (kangkong goreng), salted egg, fish cake, tofu, omelette, minced meat, braised tau kway, Hei Bee Hiang (fried shrimp chilli paste), and vegetables.

Thailand 

In Thai cuisine, rice congee, known as Chok or Jok (a loanword from Min Nan Chinese), is often served as breakfast with a raw or partially cooked egg added. Minced pork or beef and chopped spring onions are usually added, and the dish is optionally topped with a small donut-like pathongko, fried garlic, slivered ginger, and spicy pickles such as pickled radish. Although it is more popular as a breakfast dish, many stores specializing in Jok sell it throughout the day. Variations in the meat and toppings are also frequently found. It is especially popular during Thailand's cool season.

Plain rice congee, known as khao tom kui, is served at specialty restaurants, which serve a multitude of side dishes to go with it, such as yam kun chiang (a Thai salad made with sliced dried Chinese sausages), mu phalo (pork stewed in soy sauce and five-spice powder), and mu nam liap (minced pork fried with chopped Chinese olives).

Notable Jok eateries in Bangkok can be found in areas like Bang Rak on Charoen Krung, home to Jok Prince which received the Bib Gourmand from Michelin Guidebook, Talat Noi in Chinatown beside Wat Traimit near Hua Lamphong, and the Jok Chai neighbourhood in Lat Phrao, where the dish is available 24 hours a day. Khao tom kui is found in areas such as the Yaowarat and Wong Wian Yi Sip Song Karakadakhom (July 22 Circle) neighbourhoods.

In a popular reference within the 2011 US comedy film The Hangover Part II set in Thailand, Jok is described as being a food for ″small babies and very old people″ with ″no taste″ that is nourishment ″everybody can digest″. The reference is used to describe the character of the protagonist Stu Price (portrayed by Ed Helms).

Vietnam 

In Vietnam, rice congee, called cháo, is sometimes cooked with pandan leaves or Asian mung bean. In its simplest form (plain rice porridge, known as cháo hoa), it is a food for times of famine and hardship to stretch the rice ration. Alternately, as is especially common among Buddhist monks, nuns and lay persons, it can be a simple breakfast food eaten with pickled vegetables or fermented tofu (chao).

Despite its ubiquity among the poor, it is also popular as a main dish when cooked with a variety of meats. For example, cháo gà is cooked with chicken, garlic, and ginger. The rice porridge is cooked in chicken broth, and when the chicken is cooked, the meat is sliced and layered on a bed of shredded raw cabbage and sliced scallions and drizzled with a vinegar-based sauce, to be eaten as a side dish. Other combinations include cháo vịt (duck porridge), which is cooked in the same manner as chicken porridge. Cháo lòng heo is made with lòng heo, a variety of offal from pork or duck with sliced portions of congealed pork blood. Cháo is typically served with quẩy on the side.

 is a congee containing pig kidney. A specialty of the Hóc Môn District in Ho Chi Minh City, it is typically eaten in rural areas of southern Vietnam.

Youtiao is usually added to congee especially at congee vendors.

It is also common to eat cháo when ill, as it is believed the porridge is easy to digest while being fortifying. For such purposes, the cháo is sometimes cooked with roasted white rice, giving the porridge broth a more nuanced body and a subtle, nutty flavor. In some parts of Vietnam, local customs call for making cháo as offerings for the "wandering souls" during the Buddhist Vu Lan summer feast.

South Asia

South India 

Kanji is also prepared with different grains available in different parts of Karnataka, for example minor millet or pearl millet, finger millet, broken wheat, maize. In coastal districts of Dakshina Kannada and Udupi of Karavali region of Karnataka state, Ganji made from parboiled or red or brown rice or white was staple food of most inhabitants of those districts. Also a special type of Ganji is prepared on  the occasion of Dwadashi in Tulu speaking Shivalli Brahmins households Even today still many households in those districts have Ganji as staple food.In Kerala it is eaten as a porridge with green lentils or chutney.  is prepared with rice or ragi. Nuts and spices are added to the  depending on the economic status or health requirements. Rice  is prepared by boiling rice in large amounts of water. To this preparation, either milk and sugar (usually jaggery) or curd (yoghurt) and salt are added.  is prepared by drying  sprouts in shade, and then grinding them into a smooth powder. This powder is added to water and cooked. Milk and brown sugar are added to this cooked preparation for taste.  can be given to infants after six months. Sago is dry roasted and powdered with/ without sugar. Powdered sago is boiled in water until cooked. This is eaten by all ages from adults to infants as young as three months.

The farming and manual labour community of the same region, on the other hand, consume on a daily basis in the late morning as a source of energy. The rice here is usually eaten boiled, with dry fish, vegetables or pickles.

In the state of Kerala,  used to be considered as a main course, particularly for dinner, by the majority. It is still popular, although usually only eaten regularly by those lower down the socio-economic ladder. 'milk congee') where milk was substituted for water base. During the Malayalam month of Karkkidakam, a medicinal  is made using Ayurvedic herbs, milk and jaggery. Karkkidakam is known as the month of diseases since the monsoon starts during Karkkidakam.  is eaten to promote the immune system.

 means old congee (leftover from the previous day). It is not necessarily eaten by poor people, neither it is necessarily re-heated with leftover curries.

According to the Indian writer Madhur Jaffrey,  is, or derives from, a Tamil word for "boiling"—which refers to the porridge and also to any water in which rice has been cooked.

Muslims of south India especially Tamil Muslim, Mappila and Beary prepare special congee during Ramadhan called  (lit. 'fasting porridge'). This is prepared by adding spices like turmeric, dry ginger, pepper, onion, and coconut paste to the congee. Sometimes fenugreek seeds are added to it to enhance the flavour.

In Goa state and Udupi and Dakshina Kannada districts, people usually eat rice  in a variant manner made by Kannada-speaking, Tulu-speaking or Konkani people in and around Udupi and Mangalore (Karnataka, South India). Jain ganji matt are famous in these districts. Usually, simple ganji with pickle and milk are served, in Jain matts. Fresh coconut is grated, and the resulting milk skimmed and added to the ganji (called paez or pyaaz in Konkani), which is served hot with fish curry, coconut chutney, or Indian pickles. In Goa, it is normally served with dried or fresh cooked fish, papad or vegetables.

In the state of Andhra Pradesh, it is called ganji in Telugu. Ganji is made by boiling rice in large amounts of water and then the filtered liquid is known as Ganji. Ganji mixed with buttermilk is believed to add to the flavor, and is also suggested by doctors for patients with ailing health.

Kaanji is a traditional Odia dish. It is a soup-based dish like dal, but tastes a little sour. It is made of rice starch fermented for a few days in an earthen pot. This is considered a healthy dish as many winter vegetables are used as main ingredients. It is seasoned with mustard seeds and turmeric and served hot.. Pakhala is a separate dish with certain similarities to the congee.

In the Buddhist Yāgu Sutta of the Aṅguttara Nikāya (AN 5.207), the Buddha recommends eating rice porridge, "yāgu": "There are these five benefits in rice porridge. What five? It stills hunger, dispels thirst, settles wind, cleans out the bladder, and promotes the digestion of the remnants of undigested food. These are the five benefits of rice porridge.".

Congee is also eaten by people in Kerala. It is also occasionally made with rice.It is a salty simple kanji with green chili and coconut milk.It is just as often made with coconut milk so it is known as (paal kanji) in Kerala. It is also a famous food in Tamil Nadu. In Tamil this is called 'Chithirai' kanji, Chithirai being the Tamil month coinciding with April/May, made for a festival in this month. It is a salty simple kanji with green chilis, onions and coconut milk in Tamil Nadu.

Sri Lanka 

In Sri Lanka, several types of congee are known as kenda in Sinhalese. Sinhala people use congee as a breakfast, a side dish, an accessory to indigenous medical therapies, and a sweet. Kenda can be prepared with many ingredients, including rice, roasted rice, rice flour, finger millet flour, sago, coconut milk, herbs, tubers, kitul flour, and mung bean. When it is prepared with rice and water only, it is known as hal kenda. If salt is added to bring a much saltier taste, it is known as lunu kenda, a dish commonly used as a supplementary diet in purgation therapy in indigenous medical traditions. If roasted rice is used, the congee becomes bendi hal kenda, utilized to treat diarrheal diseases. If rice flour and coconut milk are the main ingredients, such congee is known as kiriya. If finger millet flour and water is used, it is known as kurakkan anama. If coconut milk is added, the dish is called kurakkan kenda. If sago is used, such congee is known as sawu kenda. A special type of congee prepared from the byproducts of coconut oil production is known as pol kiri kenda. There are many varieties of kola kenda, congee with herbs as an ingredient; sometimes, a vaidya or veda mahttaya (a physician trained in indigenous medical traditions) might prescribe a special type of kola kenda, known under such circumstances as behet kenda. Sinhala villagers use specific tubers for preparing congee, such as Diascorea species tubers. If kitul flour is mixed with boiling water and coconut milk added to it, this special type of congee is known as kitul piti kenda. Kenda prepared with mung beans is known as mung eta kenda.

Most of the time, kiriya, kurakkan kenda, sawu kenda, pol kiri kenda and kitul piti kenda are used as sweets. Sugar, candy, dates, raisins, cashew nut, jaggery, and treacle are among the ingredients that may be added to sweeten these congees.

Congee is also eaten by Sri Lankan Moors for iftar during Ramadan. It is also occasionally made with oats. Tamils and Moors in Sri Lanka call it  (rice ) and may use chicken or beef for it. It is just as often made with milk (paal kanji), and there are many other combinations with appropriate prefixes in Tamil; One very special type being 'Chithirai' kanji, Chithirai being the Tamil month coinciding with April/May, made for a festival in this month. It is a salty simple kanji with green chilis, onions and coconut milk.

Europe

Portugal 
In Portugal, a traditional soup made of rice and chicken meat is named canja or Canja de galinha. The Portuguese likely picked up the dish from their colonies in Western/Southern India or Sri Lanka; where the soup remains a staple (particularly for the ill). The rice is not cooked for as long as in Asian congee, so it is very soft, but not disintegrated. Traditionally, a boiling fowl containing small, immature eggs is used; the eggs are carefully boiled and served in the canja. This soup is sometimes served with a fresh mint leaf on top. Strongly valued as comfort food, it is traditionally given to people recovering from disease, as in Asia, and in some regions of Portugal, there is even a custom of feeding the mother a strict diet of canja in the first weeks after childbirth. It is also eaten traditionally in Brazil and Cape Verde, former Portuguese colonies.

See also 

 Bap
 Cooked rice
 Curd rice
 Gruel
 Kasha
 Lâpa
 Mieum
 Oatmeal
 Papeda
 Rice cereal
 Rice pudding
 Sampan congee
 Sungnyung
 List of ancient dishes
 List of porridges

Notes

References

External links 

 Chicken Congee. NYT Cooking.

 
Ancient dishes
Burmese cuisine
Chinese rice dishes
Hong Kong cuisine
Indian rice dishes
Japanese rice dishes
Juk
Philippine rice dishes
Taiwanese rice dishes
Tamil cuisine
Thai rice dishes
Vietnamese rice dishes
Buddhist cuisine